Daniel de Faria Dias (born 24 May 1988) is a Brazilian Paralympic swimmer. Having learnt to swim in 2004 after being inspired by Clodoaldo Silva at the 2004 Summer Paralympics, he entered his first international competition two years later winning five medals. He competed in a wide range of swimming events at the 2008, 2012, 2016 and 2020 Paralympics and won 27 medals, including 14 gold medals.

Early life
Dias was born in 1988 in Campinas, a city to the north of São Paulo. He was born with malformed upper and lower limbs. Dias began swimming at the age of 16, after being inspired by Clodoaldo Silva competing at the 2004 Summer Paralympics, and learned four styles of swimming in two months. He studied mechatronical engineering and physical education at the Universidade São Francisco.

Career
His first major event was the 2006 IPC Swimming World Championships in Durban, South Africa. He won the gold medal in three events, and a silver medal in a further two. At the age of 20, he competed in his first Paralympic Games at Beijing in 2008. The Games proved highly successful for Dias, who won more medals than any other athlete. He received a total of nine medals including four golds, four silvers, and one bronze across a range of different distances and disciplines.

Dias won the Laureus Award in 2009 for Sportsperson of the Year with a Disability, being awarded it by British athlete Sebastian Coe at a ceremony in London. Dias was an ambassador for his country's bid for the 2016 Summer Olympics and Paralympics, and was present for the presentation of the Candidature File to the International Olympic Committee.

Dias won the Sportsperson of the Year with a Disability for the second time in 2012 after winning 6 gold medals all in world record time at the 2012 Paralympic Games.

, he holds IPC long course swimming world records in all strokes, at a range of distances – 50, 100 and 200 metre freestyle (S5), 50 and 100 metres backstroke (S5), 50 and 100 metres butterfly (S5), 50 and 100 metres breaststroke (SB4) and 200 metre individual medley (SM5).

In 2016 he was compared to Michael Phelps, a retired non-Paralympic American competitive swimmer. Despite such an honorable comparison Daniel Dias said that he is Daniel Dias.

References

External links

  
 
 

1988 births
Living people
Paralympic gold medalists for Brazil
Paralympic silver medalists for Brazil
Paralympic bronze medalists for Brazil
Paralympic swimmers of Brazil
Laureus World Sports Awards winners
World record holders in paralympic swimming
Swimmers at the 2008 Summer Paralympics
Swimmers at the 2012 Summer Paralympics
Medalists at the 2008 Summer Paralympics
Medalists at the 2012 Summer Paralympics
S5-classified Paralympic swimmers
Swimmers at the 2016 Summer Paralympics
Medalists at the 2016 Summer Paralympics
Swimmers at the 2020 Summer Paralympics
Medalists at the 2020 Summer Paralympics
Paralympic medalists in swimming
Medalists at the World Para Swimming Championships
Medalists at the 2007 Parapan American Games
Medalists at the 2011 Parapan American Games
Medalists at the 2015 Parapan American Games
Medalists at the 2019 Parapan American Games
Brazilian male freestyle swimmers
Brazilian male backstroke swimmers
Brazilian male breaststroke swimmers
Brazilian male butterfly swimmers
Brazilian male medley swimmers
Sportspeople from Campinas
21st-century Brazilian people